UFC Fight Night: Poirier vs. Johnson (also known as UFC Fight Night 94) was a mixed martial arts event produced by the Ultimate Fighting Championship held on September 17, 2016, at State Farm Arena in Hidalgo, Texas.

Background
After contesting several other PPV and Fight Night events across Texas, this was the first that the promotion has hosted in Hidalgo.

A lightweight bout between Dustin Poirier and Michael Johnson served as the event headliner.

Manvel Gamburyan was scheduled to face Alejandro Pérez at the event. However, Gamburyan pulled out of the fight in mid-August for undisclosed personal reasons and was replaced by Albert Morales.

Abel Trujillo was expected to face Evan Dunham at the event. However, Trujillo pulled out of the fight on September 5, citing an undisclosed injury. In turn, former WSOF Featherweight Champion and promotional newcomer Rick Glenn was announced as his replacement.

Results

Bonus awards
The following fighters were awarded $50,000 bonuses:
Fight of the Night: Evan Dunham vs. Rick Glenn
Performance of the Night: Michael Johnson and Chas Skelly

See also
List of UFC events
2016 in UFC

References

UFC Fight Night
September 2016 sports events in the United States
Mixed martial arts in Texas
2016 in mixed martial arts
2016 in sports in Texas